The Aegean Army or Fourth Army is one of the four main formations of the Turkish Army. It covers the entire west coast of the Anatolia peninsula and has its headquarters in İzmir. It was organised in the 1970s in response to political tensions with Greece - the ongoing Aegean dispute.

Its stated mission is to protect Turkey's territory on its western coast. This is directed against the perceived threat posed by Greece's armament of the Aegean Sea islands. Greece, on the other hand, perceives the presence of the Aegean Army as a threat to its islands, citing strong offensive capabilities ascribed to the Aegean Army as well as the exposed and isolated geographical position of the islands, the 5 most populous of which are several hundred kilometres distant from the Greek mainland, yet sit only 2-3km from Turkey's, as reasons of concern. Greek sources particularly point to the strong amphibian forces maintained by the Aegean Army as an indicator of its offensive nature. Turkey has countered such concerns by stating that besides being of a fundamentally defensive nature it is "basically a training army".

History 
It was established on July 20, 1975, independently from NATO, when the situation became more tense and the possibility of war increased with the Cyprus Operation, which was made in a period when the tension increased after the coup in Greece on April 21, 1967, against the threat posed by the armament of Greece in the Aegean islands. Its headquarters is in Narlıdere.

Units
The Army has been reported to consist of the following units and organizations:
Cyprus Turkish Peace Force
Headquarters
28th Mechanized Infantry Division (Paşaköy Kyrenia) 
 39th Mechanized Infantry Division (Çamlıbel, Morphou) 
 14th Armoured Brigade (Degirmenlik, Nicosia)
 49th Special Force Regiment
 41st Commando Regiment
 109th Field Artillery Regiment
 190th Marines Battalion
 Communications Battalion
 Central Command Military Police Battalion
 Logistics Support Group (Kyrenia)
57th Artillery Training Brigade (Izmir)
19th Infantry Brigade (Edremit)
11th Motorised Infantry Brigade (Denizli)
3rd Infantry Training Brigade (Antalya)
1st Infantry Training Brigade (Manisa).
Marines Brigade (Foça)

See also
List of Commanders of the Aegean Army

References

External links
 Turkey and Greece: Time to Settle the Aegean Dispute
 https://wikileaks.org/plusd/cables/1975IZMIR00162_b.html - 1975 United States State Department report of creation of army
 

Field armies of Turkey
Military in İzmir Province
Military units and formations established in 1975